Intelsat III F-3 was a geostationary communications satellite operated by Intelsat. Launched in 1969 it was intended for operations over the Pacific Ocean; however, it spent most of its service life over the Indian Ocean at a longitude of 63 degrees east.

The third of eight Intelsat III satellites to be launched, Intelsat III F-3 was built by TRW. The satellite carried an SVM-2 apogee motor for propulsion and was equipped with two transponders powered by body-mounted solar cells generating 183 watts of power. It was designed for 5 years of service life.

The launch of Intelsat III F-3 made use of a Delta M rocket flying from Launch Complex 17A at the Cape Canaveral Air Force Station. The launch, which was conducted by NASA, took place at 00:39:00 UTC on February 6, 1969, with the spacecraft entering a geosynchronous transfer orbit. Shortly after launch, Intelsat III F-3 fired its apogee motor to achieve geostationary orbit. 

Intended to be operated over the Pacific Ocean at a longitude of 174° east, Intelsat III F-3 was moved to the less important Indian Ocean slot at 63° east after only three months in orbit due to concerns regarding its reliability. The satellite was only regarded as partially operable; however, it remained in service until April 1979, before being decommissioned in December of that year.

At the end of its service life, Intelsat III F-3 was raised into a higher orbit to reduce the probability of it colliding with an operational spacecraft.

References

Spacecraft launched in 1969
Intelsat satellites